This is a list of hospitals in İzmir, Turkey.

State hospitals
Aliağa Devlet Hastanesi, Aliağa
Atatürk Eğitim ve Araştırma Hastanesi, Yeşilyurt, Konak
Bayındır Devlet Hastanesi, Bayındır
Bergama Dr. Faruk İlker Devlet Hastanesi, Bergama
Bornova Türkan Özilhan Devlet Hastanesi, Bornova
Bozyaka Eğitim ve Araştırma Hastanesi, Bozyaka, Konak
Buca Seyfi Demirsoy Devlet Hastanesi, Buca
Buca Doğumevi ve Çocuk Hastalıkları Hastanesi, Buca
Çeşme Alper Çizgenakat Devlet Hastanesi, Çeşme
Çiğli Devlet Hastanesi, Çiğli
D.D.Y. Hastanesi, Alsancak, Konak
Dikili Devlet Hastanesi, Dikili
Dr. Behçet Uz Çocuk Hastanesi, Alsancak
Dr. Suat Seren Göğüs Hastalıkları Ve Cerrahi Eğitim Hastanesi, Yenişehir, Konak
Eşrefpaşa Belediye Hastanesi, Yenişehir, Konak
Foça Devlet Hastanesi, Foça
İzmir Eğitim Diş Hastanesi, Konak
Karşıyaka Devlet Hastanesi, Serinkuyu, Karşıyaka
Kemalpaşa Devlet Hastanesi, Kemalpaşa
Kiraz Devlet Hastanesi, Kiraz
Menemen Devlet Hastanesi, Menemen
Nevvar - Salih İşgören Alsancak Devlet Hastanesi, Alsancak, Konak
Ödemiş Devlet Hastanesi, Ödemiş
Seferihisar Necat Hepkon Devlet Hastanesi, Seferihisar
Selçuk Devlet Hastanesi, Selçuk
Tepecik Eğitim ve Araştırma Hastanesi, Yenişehir, Konak
Tire Devlet Hastanesi, Tire
Torbalı Devlet Hastanesi, Torbalı
Urla Devlet Hastanesi, Urla

Birth hospitals
Ege Üniversitesi Tıp Fakültesi Doğumevi, Bornova
Dr. E.Hayri Üstündağ Kadın Hastalıkları ve Doğum Hastanesi, Konak
SGK Tepecik Doğum Hastanesi, Yenişehir, Konak
Özel Çınarlı Kadın Doğum Hastanesi, Konak

University hospitals
Başkent Üniversitesi Zübeyde Hanım Hastanesi, Bostanlı, Karşıyaka
Dokuz Eylül Üniversitesi Tıp Fakültesi Hastanesi, İnciraltı, Balçova
Ege Üniversitesi Tıp Fakültesi Hastanesi, Bornova

Military hospitals
Güzelyalı Hava Hastanesi, Üçkuyular, Konak
İzmir Mevki Asker Hastanesi, Hatay, Konak

Private hospitals
Özel Akut Kalp Damar Hastanesi, Gaziemir
Özel Atakalp Hastanesi, Konak
Özel Baki Uzun Hastanesi, Karabağlar
BatıAnadolu Central Hospital, Bayraklı
Ekol Kulak Burun Boğaz Hastanesi, Çiğli
Özel Deniz Hastanesi, Yenişehir, Konak
Özel Diabet Hastanesi, Yenişehir, Konak
Özel Ege Sağlık Hastanesi, Alsancak, Konak
Özel Egepol Hastanesi, Karabağlar
Özel El Ve Mikrocerrahi Hastanesi, Alsancak, Konak
Özel Gazi Hastanesi, Alsancak, Konak
Özel Gözde Hastanesi, Yenişehir, Konak
Özel Hayat Hastanesi, Konak
Özel İzmir Hastanesi, Konak
Özel Karataş Hastanesi, Karataş, Konak
Özel Kaşkaloğlu Göz Hastanesi Alsancak, Konak
Özel Kent Hastanesi, Çiğli
Medical Park İzmir Hastanesi, Karşıyaka
Özel Medifema Hastanesi, Torbalı
Özel Su Hastanesi, Kahramanlar, Konak
Özel Tınaztepe Hastanesi, Buca
Dentleon Hospital, Bornova

 
Izmir